The Nurom Hat Museum is a museum with hats from all over the world, located in Kumasi, Ghana. It was established in 1960.

References

See also 
 List of museums in Ghana

Museums in Ghana
Museums established in 1960
1960 establishments in Ghana
Buildings and structures in Kumasi